Elterwater is a village in the English Lake District and the county of Cumbria. The village lies half a mile (800 m) north-west of the lake of Elter Water, from which it derives its name. Both are situated in the valley of Great Langdale.

Elterwater Bridge is a Grade II listed structure dating to at least the 18th century.

Economic activity

In the past, the principal industries have been farming,  quarrying for slate and gunpowder manufacture. The first two activities continue, while evidence of the latter survives in the grounds of the Langdale Estate, a holiday development founded in the 1930s and redeveloped as a timeshare in the 1980s. In the present day, tourism is a principal source of income and the village is popular with fell-walkers.

Art

In the 1880s, the Guild of St George founded by John Ruskin  revived small-scale linen spinning and weaving in Langdale, at a cottage in Elterwater, led by Albert Fleming and Marion Twelves and continued by Elizabeth Pepper. The decorative textiles became known as Ruskin Lace. In 1947, German artist Kurt Schwitters created one of his  in a barn at Cylinders. This three-dimensional artwork, and the entire wall on which it was installed, was moved to the Hatton Gallery in Newcastle in 1965. Artist Bernard Eyre-Walker lived and painted in Elterwater in the 1930s and 40s. Watercolour painter Thomas Frederick Worrall's painting Elterwater Tarn and Langdale Pikes is in the Bishop of Carlisle's house in Keswick.

Only a quarter of the houses in Elterwater are permanently occupied, the rest being holiday cottages.

Etymology

" 'The lake frequented by swans', from ON 'elptr'/'alpt' 'swan', in the gen.[itive], sing.[ular] form with '-ar', and 'water', probably replacing ON 'vatn' 'lake'. Whooper swans still winter on the lake". (ON is Old Norse).

Gallery

References

Bibliography

External links

Villages in Cumbria
Westmorland
South Lakeland District